Three Worlds is a lithograph print by the Dutch artist M. C. Escher first printed in December 1955.

Three Worlds depicts a large pool or lake during the autumn or winter months, the title referring to the three visible perspectives in the picture: the surface of the water on which leaves float, the world above the surface, observable by the water's reflection of a forest, and the world below the surface, observable in the large fish swimming just below the water's surface.

Escher also created a picture named Two Worlds.

See also
Puddle
Printmaking

Sources
Locher, J. L. (2000). The Magic of M. C. Escher. Harry N. Abrams, Inc. .

External links
 Gallery of Eschers images

Works by M. C. Escher
1955 prints
Fish in art
Water in art